{{Speciesbox
| image = Rosa pendulina PID1949-1.jpg
| status = LC
| status_system = IUCN3.1
| status_ref = 
| genus = Rosa
| species = pendulina
| authority = L.
| synonyms = {{Collapsible list |
Ozanonia alpina (L. ex Hartm.) Gand.
Ripartia pyrenaica Gand.
Rosa adenophora Kit.
Rosa adjecta D‚s‚gl.
Rosa affinis Sternb.
Rosa alpina L.
Rosa alpina var. aculeata Ser.
Rosa alpina subsp. aculeata (Ser.) Arcang.
Rosa alpina var. adjecta (D‚s‚gl.) Nyman
Rosa alpina var. bordereana Rouy
Rosa alpina var. glandulosa (Bellardi ex Ser.) Nyman
Rosa alpina var. globosa Desv.
Rosa alpina var. gratianopolitana Rouy
Rosa alpina var. heterophylla Rouy
Rosa alpina var. humilis Rouy
Rosa alpina var. intermedia Gren.
Rosa alpina var. laevis Ser.
Rosa alpina subsp. laevis (Ser.) Arcang.
Rosa alpina var. lagenaria (Vill.) Ser.
Rosa alpina var. lamotteana Rouy
Rosa alpina var. latifolia Ser.
Rosa alpina var. lixoniensis Rouy
Rosa alpina var. macroacantha Rouy
Rosa alpina var. macrophylla Hagenb.
Rosa alpina var. monspeliaca (Gouan) Steud.
Rosa alpina subsp. monspeliaca (Gouan) Nyman
Rosa alpina var. montisludovici Rouy
Rosa alpina var. norica J.B.Keller
Rosa alpina var. nuda Gren.
Rosa alpina var. nudipes Rouy
Rosa alpina var. ovoidea Rouy
Rosa alpina var. pendulina (L.) Loisel. & Michel
Rosa alpina var. provincialis Rouy
Rosa alpina var. pseudopyrenaica Rouy
Rosa alpina var. pubescens Gren.
Rosa alpina var. pyrenaica (Gouan) Ser.
Rosa alpina subsp. pyrenaica (Gouan) Nyman
Rosa alpina var. rotundifolia Boullu
Rosa alpina var. setosa Ser.
Rosa alpina var. subglobosa Rouy
Rosa alpina var. sublaevis Rouy
Rosa alpina var. vestita Gren.
Rosa alpiniformis Haynald ex Borb s
Rosa aucuparioides Debeaux
Rosa balcanica Dimitrov
Rosa balsamea Kit.
Rosa brandisii J.B.Keller ex Wiesb.
Rosa cinnamomea L.
Rosa cinnamomea var. globosa Desv.
Rosa coccialba Kmet
Rosa croatica Kit. ex Kanitz
Rosa detonsa Debeaux
Rosa diplacantha (Borb s) Heinr.Braun
Rosa filispina Debeaux
Rosa glandulosa Bellardi
Rosa hybrida Vill.
Rosa inermis Turra
Rosa × intercalaris D‚s‚gl.
Rosa laevis (Ser.) Dalla Torre & Sarnth.
Rosa lagenaria Vill.
Rosa majalis var. globosa (Desv.) P.V.Heath
Rosa × malyi A.Kern.
Rosa monspeliaca Gouan
Rosa odoratissima Scop.
Rosa pendula Salisb.
Rosa pendula Roth
Rosa pendulina var. aculeata (Ser.) R.Keller
Rosa pendulina var. adenophora (Kit.) R.Keller
Rosa pendulina var. alpina (L. ex Hartm.) Heinr.Braun
Rosa pendulina var. balsamea (Kit.) R.Keller
Rosa pendulina var. borbasii R.Keller
Rosa pendulina var. bosniaca (J.B.Keller & Wiesb.) R.Keller
Rosa pendulina var. croatica (Kit.) Borb s
Rosa pendulina var. curtidens (H.Christ) R.Keller
Rosa pendulina var. ebelii (Heinr.Braun) R.Keller
Rosa pendulina subsp. ebelii Heinr.Braun
Rosa pendulina var. globosa (Desv.) Hayek
Rosa pendulina var. imhoofii R.Keller
Rosa pendulina var. intercalaris (D‚s‚gl.) R.Keller
Rosa pendulina var. intermedia (Gren.) C.Vicioso
Rosa pendulina var. laevis (Ser.) R.Keller
Rosa pendulina var. lagenaria (Vill.) Heinr.Braun
Rosa pendulina subsp. mediterranea Kl št.
Rosa pendulina var. norica (J.B.Keller) Heinr.Braun
Rosa pendulina var. opaca Chrshan.
Rosa pendulina var. ovoidea (Rouy) C.Vicioso
Rosa pendulina var. popovii Chrshan.
Rosa pendulina var. pseudopyrenaica (Rouy) C.Vicioso
Rosa pendulina var. pubescens (W.D.J.Koch) R.Keller
Rosa pendulina var. pyrenaica (Gouan) Fiori
Rosa pendulina var. rupestris Crantz ex Heinr.Braun
Rosa pendulina var. scabriuscula (H.Christ) R.Keller
Rosa pendulina var. setosa (Ser.) R.Keller
Rosa pendulina var. sternbergii (Heinr.Braun) Heinr.Braun
Rosa pendulina var. sublaevis (Rouy) C.Vicioso
Rosa pimpinellifolia subsp. alpina L. ex Hartm.
Rosa pyrenaica GouanRosa recurva Kit.Rosa reversa W.D.J.KochRosa rubrifolia var. glandulosa Bellardi ex Ser.Rosa rupestris CrantzRosa semisimplex (Borb s) Heinr.BraunRosa semisimplex var. adenophora (Kit.) Borb s ex R.KellerRosa setosa (Ser.) Dalla Torre & Sarnth.Rosa stenodonta (Borb s) Heinr.BraunRosa tenuiflora (Borb s) Heinr.BraunRosa turbinata Vill.Rosa villarsii Tratt. ex Link
 }}
| synonyms_ref = 
}}Rosa pendulina, (syn. Rosa alpina), the Alpine rose or mountain rose, is a species of wild rose found in the mountains of central and southern Europe. It appears to have survived in glacial refugia in the Alps and Carpathians, and spread out from there. A climbing shrub with deep pink flowers and relatively few thorns, it has had a history of cultivation as an ornamental plant.

DescriptionRosa pendulina is a climbing (or rambling) shrub between 0.5 and 2m, rarely 3m tall. The flowers are typically semi-doubled and deep pink to fuchsia, brightening towards the center. It can be distinguished from other members of its genus by its relative lack of thorns (prickles), especially higher up on the plant, its oblong fruits (hips) which hang downwards (are pendulous, hence the specific epithet), its hispid peduncles and petioles, and its smooth stems and branches. The chromosome number is 4n = 28.

 Distribution 
It prefers to grow in relatively warmer, shadier, and wetter areas alongside streams, in openings in forests, or on rock piles, between 350 and 2,500m above sea level.

It is mostly found in the subalpine zone of the mountains of Central and Southern Europe: the Pyrenees, the Massif Central, the Alps (at elevations of up to 2300–2600m in the various parts of the range), throughout the Carpathians (up to 1800m in the Tatras), in Czechia and adjacent areas of Germany and Poland, in the Apennines and in the mountains of the Balkan Peninsula (at elevations of 1000–2500m in Bulgaria).

It has been introduced to New England and can be found growing as a garden escapee elsewhere. 

Cultivation
Often called by its synonym Rosa alpina, the Alpine rose has been in cultivation for hundreds of years (c.1683), with many varieties that are practically forgotten today. It has contributed genetically to an unknown, but large, number of extant rose cultivars. It flowers early, has a pleasing, strong fragrance, and is nearly thornless, all desirable traits for rose breeders. An undesirable trait is that it has weak pedicels supporting the flowers, which leads to the pendulous habit of the fruits. It is hardy to USDA Zone 4a.

Varieties
Numerous varieties (and even subspecies) were described for R. pendulina and R. alpina (see list of synonyms), but these have all been collapsed into R. pendulina.

HybridsRosa pendulina is said to be the parent of a number of hybrids. Rosa × anachoretica Schmidely (R. montana × R. pendulina)Rosa × buseri Rouy (R. pendulina × R. sherardii)Rosa × brueggeri Killias (R. glauca × R. pendulina)Rosa × hispidocarpa (J.B. Keller) G. Beck (R. canina × R. pendulina)Rosa × intercalaris Déségl. (R. pendulina × R. villosa)Rosa × iserana Rouy (R. pendulina × R. rubiginosa)Rosa × lheritierana Thory (R. chinensis × R. pendulina)Rosa × reversa Kit. (R. pendulina × R. spinosissima)Rosa × salaevensis Rapin (R. dumalis × R. pendulina)Rosa × spinulifolia Dematra (R. pendulina × R. tomentosa)Rosa × wasserburgensis Kirschleger (R. trachyphylla × R. pendulina × R. tomentosa)

Cultivars
Many of these cultivars are quite old and would be assessed differently using modern standards. Rose fanciers tended to call all sports, chance seedlings, regional variants, natural hybrids, and artificial hybrids "varieties" rather than "cultivars". Some, such as the Boursault roses, would probably be considered Groups today. Simply having some R. pendulina ancestry, such as with the Moomin rose (Rosa 'Tove Jansson'), does not make a rose a cultivar of R. pendulina. 
'Amadis' (Crimson Boursault. The Boursaults are said to be R. chinensis × R. pendulina'' with some uncertainty)
'Bourgogne'
'Calypso' (Blush Boursault)
'Harstad'
'Inermis', also called 'Morletti' or 'Morlettii'     
'Mount Everest'
'Nana' 
'Plena' (could be 'Inermis')

References

pendulina
Flora of Europe
Plants described in 1753
Taxa named by Carl Linnaeus